The Official Opposition Shadow Cabinet in Canada is composed of Members of Parliament of the main Opposition party responsible for holding the Government to account and for developing and disseminating the party's policy positions. Members of the Official Opposition are generally referred to as Opposition Critics, but the term Shadow Minister (which is generally used in other Westminster systems) is also used. The Conservative Party of Canada served as the Official Opposition in the 42nd Parliament.

By Member
82 MPs have served in the Official Opposition Cabinet in the 42nd Parliament. 35 MPs are currently Senior Shadow Ministers. Highlight indicates that a Member is a current Senior Shadow Minister. Of the senior members of Shadow Cabinet, 24 are men and 11 are women. 6 are visible minorities.

By Shadow Cabinet 
Following the 2015 federal election, held on October 19, 2015, the Conservative Party lost power and became the 42nd Parliament of Canada's Official Opposition. It was led by Rona Ambrose on an interim basis from November 2015 to May 2017.

Andrew Scheer was elected permanent leader in May 2017.

Andrew Scheer

Scheer VI (September 7, 2018 – October 21, 2019)

Scheer V (June 13, 2018 –  September 6, 2018)

Scheer IV (January 31, 2018 –  June 12, 2018)

Scheer III (September 25, 2017 – January 30, 2018)

Scheer II (August 30, 2017 – September 24, 2017)

Scheer I (May 27, 2017 – August 30, 2017)

Rona Ambrose

Ambrose VI (October 16, 2016 – May 27, 2017)

Ambrose V (September 15, 2016 – October 15, 2016)

Ambrose IV (July 13, 2016 – September 14, 2016)

Ambrose III (May 17, 2016 – July 12, 2016)

Ambrose II (April 8, 2016 – May 16, 2016)

Ambrose I (October 19, 2015 – April 7, 2016)

See also 

 List of Leaders of the Official Opposition (Canada)
 Leader of the Opposition in the House of Commons (Canada)
 Leader of the Opposition in the Senate (Canada)
 Official Opposition (Canada)

References 

Canadian shadow cabinets

Government of Canada
Westminster system